Honeychile is a 1951 American comedy film directed by R. G. Springsteen and written by Charles E. Roberts, Jack Townley and Barry Trivers. The film stars Judy Canova, Eddie Foy, Jr., Alan Hale, Jr., Walter Catlett, Claire Carleton and Karolyn Grimes. The film was released on October 20, 1951 by Republic Pictures.

Plot

Cast
    
Judy Canova as Judy Canova
Eddie Foy, Jr. as Eddie Price
Alan Hale, Jr. as Joe Boyd
Walter Catlett as Al Moore
Claire Carleton as Betty Loring
Karolyn Grimes as Effie
Brad Morrow as Larry
Roy Barcroft as Walter Judson
Leonid Kinskey as Chick Lister
Gus Schilling as Window Washer
Irving Bacon as Abner
Fuzzy Knight as Ice Cream Vendor
Roscoe Ates as Bob
Ida Moore as Harriet
Sarah Edwards as Sarah
Emory Parnell as Mayor
Dick Elliott as Sheriff
Dick Wessel as Bartender
William Fawcett as Ben Todd
Robin Winans as Boy
Stanley Blystone as Mr. Olson
Donia Bussey as Mrs. Olson
John Crawford as Marvin McKay
Cecil Elliott as Woman
Cecil Weston as Woman

References

External links 
 

1951 films
American comedy films
1951 comedy films
Republic Pictures films
Films directed by R. G. Springsteen
Trucolor films
1950s English-language films
1950s American films